The 1980 Belgian motorcycle Grand Prix was the sixth round of the 1980 Grand Prix motorcycle racing season. It took place on the weekend of 4–6 July 1980 at the Circuit Zolder.

This was the only time that a race was held in Zolder, after all the factory teams (with drivers such as Kenny Roberts, Franco Uncini, Graziano Rossi, Jack Middelburg and various others) retired due to the slippery and very dangerous conditions at Spa-Francorchamps after a resurfacing of the track.

Classification

500 cc

References

Belgian motorcycle Grand Prix
Motorcycle Grand Prix
Belgian